The Roswell springsnail, scientific name Pyrgulopsis roswellensis, is a species of small freshwater snail, an aquatic gastropod mollusk in the family Hydrobiidae. This species is endemic to Roswell, New Mexico in the United States.

References

External links 
 Species profile of Roswell springsnail (Pyrgulopsis roswellensis) at U.S. Fish & Wildlife Service webpage

Molluscs of the United States
Pyrgulopsis
Endemic fauna of New Mexico
Gastropods described in 1987
Taxonomy articles created by Polbot